The 1981 World Archery Championships was the 31st edition of the event. It was held in Punta Ala, Italy in June 1981 and was organised by World Archery Federation (FITA).

Medals summary

Recurve

Medals table

References

External links
 World Archery website
 Complete results

World Championship
World Archery
World Archery Championships
International archery competitions hosted by Italy